Lyudmila Vyacheslavovna Prokasheva (born 23 January 1969 in Pavlodar, Kazakh SSR) is a former speed skater. Representing Kazakhstan, she won an Olympic bronze medal in the 1998 5000 metres. In 1995, she won a silver medal in the World Allround Speed Skating Championships for Women.

External links
 
 

1969 births
Living people
Kazakhstani female speed skaters
Olympic speed skaters of Kazakhstan
Olympic speed skaters of the Unified Team
Olympic bronze medalists for Kazakhstan
Olympic medalists in speed skating
Speed skaters at the 1992 Winter Olympics
Speed skaters at the 1994 Winter Olympics
Speed skaters at the 1998 Winter Olympics
Medalists at the 1998 Winter Olympics
Asian Games medalists in speed skating
Speed skaters at the 1996 Asian Winter Games
People from Pavlodar
Medalists at the 1996 Asian Winter Games
Asian Games gold medalists for Kazakhstan
World Allround Speed Skating Championships medalists